Manuel Pérez García is associate professor at the Department of History (School of Humanities) of Shanghai Jiao Tong University. He is also Distinguished Researcher at Pablo de Olavide University (UPO) of Seville (Spain). From 2013 to 2017 he was associate professor at the School of International Studies, Renmin University of China.

He received his B.A. History at the Department of Early Modern, Contemporary and American History at the University of Murcia, Spain, in 2002; his Ph.D. from European University Institute (EUI), Florence, Italy, in 2011 and his Postdoctoral Fellowship from Tsinghua University, Beijing, China, in 2013. He is the founder and director of the Global History Network in China (GHN). He is the editor-in-chief of the Palgrave Studies in Comparative Global History.

While he was completing his PhD, Manuel was a student of Jan de Vries at UCBerkeley. His PhD supervisor at the EUI was Bartolomé Yun-Casalilla and his mentor at Tsinghua University was Liu Beicheng.

He has been the first (European) researcher fully based in China to win a European Research Council (ERC) Grant. Pérez García was awarded the grant in December 2015 with his project "GECEM: Global Encounters between China and Europe: Trade Networks, Consumption and Cultural Exchanges in Macau and Marseille, 1680-1840", in which the Pablo de Olavide University (UPO) of Seville (Spain) acts as main European institution for this project.

At Shanghai Jiao Tong University he teaches Modern Economic Growth between China and Europe, International Relations between China and Europe and International Relations between China and Latin America.

Among his latest publications stands out the co-edited book with Lucio de Sousa, Global History and New Polycentric Approaches Europe, Asia and the Americas in a World Network System (XVI-XIXth centuries), Singapore: Palgrave-Macmillan, 2018; and his monograph ‘Vicarious Consumers’: Trans-National Meetings between the West and East in the Mediterranean World (1730-1808), London: Routledge, 2013, and several articles published in international peer reviewed journals listed at the Web of Science as SSCI and AHCI journals.

Research

Pérez García's research is based on the analysis of the western presence, especially European trade networks in China during the Qing dynasty, in order to see how western culture was perceived in China. Macao as a port city, in which people and goods from afar were circulated, can be defined as major place in which western culture penetrated in China. The current interest by western countries on China has fostered during last years new studies in Chinese culture, politics and rapid economic growth. The main questions are: what is the degree of knowledge of China by European society? Does really China want to jointly work with Europe in a common agenda? Since the arrival of European pioneers in China such as the Jesuit Matteo Ricci surely there have been some changes and points of common interest, but how can we explain the current massive presence of Chinese migrants in Europe and the low presence of European migrants in China?

Awards and honors

 ERC (European Research Council)-Starting Grant Award, Brussels (Europe), Brussels (Europe), 2016
 Matteo Ricci Visiting Scholarship Award, School of International Relations, Università di Macerata (Italy), 2015
 Foreign Ministry's Scholarship for Visiting Professors, Secretary of Foreign Affairs of Mexico, 2014
 UKNA-Marie Curie Actions, International Institute for Asian Studies, Leiden University, 2013–2014
 Foreign Ministry's Scholarship for Visiting Professors, Secretary of Foreign Affairs of Mexico, 2013
 52 Chinese Postdoctoral Science Foundation Grant, 2012–2013
 Post-Doctoral Fellowship, School of Humanities, Tsinghua University, 2011–2013
 Fellowship on European Mobility in Asia ('Argo Program' by the Spanish Government), 2011–2012
 Full grant by the Spanish Government, Ministerio de Educacion y Ciencia, 2006–2010
 Research grant "Salvador Madariaga Awards" by the Spanish Government, M.A.E. (Ministerio de Asuntos Exteriores), 2009–2010
 Full grant by the European University Institute to participate in the exchange program as Visiting Scholar at the University of California at Berkeley, 2008–2009
 Research grant "Salvador Madariaga Awards" by the Spanish Government, M.A.E. (Ministerio de Asuntos Exteriores), 2008–2009
 Research grant "Salvador Madariaga Awards" by the Spanish Government, M.A.E. (Ministerio de Asuntos Exteriores), 2007–2008
 Research grant "Salvador Madariaga Awards" by the Spanish Government, M.A.E. (Ministerio de Asuntos Exteriores), 2006–2007

References

External links
 Manuel Pérez García's website
 GECEM: Global Encounters between China and Europe (1680-1840)
 Global History Network in China
 Radio Nacional de España (Punto de Enlace)

1979 births
Living people
European Research Council grantees
European University Institute alumni
People from Murcia
Tsinghua University alumni
University of Murcia alumni
Academic staff of Shanghai Jiao Tong University
Academic staff of Renmin University of China